The 3rd Yeşilçam Awards, presented by the Turkish Foundation of Cinema and Audiovisual Culture (TÜRSAK) and Beyoğlu Municipality, honored the best Turkish films of 2009 and took place on March 23, 2010, at the Lütfi Kırdar Congress and Exhibition Hall in Istanbul, Turkey. Veteran Turkish actress Filiz Akın received the Special Achievement Award.

Awards and nominations
The nominees were announced at a press conference held on February 22, 2010, in Ghetto.

Best Film
 Winner: Breath directed by Levent Semerci
 I Saw the Sun directed by Mahsun Kırmızıgül
 On the Way to School directed by Orhan Eskiköy
 Pandora's Box directed by Yeşim Ustaoğlu
 Vavien directed by Yağmur & Durul Taylan

Best Director
 Winner: Reha Erdem for My Only Sunshine
 Levent Semerci for Breath
 Mahsun Kırmızıgül for I Saw the Sun
 Yağmur and Durul Taylan for Vavien
 Yeşim Ustaoğlu for Pandora's Box
 Zeki Demirkubuz for Envy

Best Actor
 Winner: Mert Fırat for Love in Another Language
 Engin Günaydın for Vavien
 Mete Horozoğlu for Breath
 Nadir Sarıbacak for Wrong Rosary
 Öner Erkan for Bornova Bornova
 Yılmaz Erdoğan for Jolly Life

Best Actress
 Winner:  Binnur Kaya for Vavien
 Demet Evgar for I Saw the Sun
 Meral Çetinkaya for In Darkness
 Nergis Öztürk for Envy
 Nesrin Cevadzade for Dilber's Eight Days
 Şerif Sezer for Piano Girl

Best Supporting Actor Award
 Winner: Cemal Toktaş for I Saw the Sun
 Cezmi Baskın for Jolly Life
 Genco Erkal for The Market: A Tale of Trade
 Mustafa Uzunyılmaz for Bogeyman
 Settar Tanrıöğen for Vavien

Best Supporting Actress Award
 Winner: Derya Alabora for Pandora's Box
 Berrak Tüzünataç for Envy
 Hasibe Eren for The Master
 Lale Mansur for Love in Another Language
 Serra Yılmaz for Vavien

Best Cinematography Award
 Winner: Soykut Turan for I Saw the Sun
 Florent Henry for Jolly Life
 Gökhan Tiryaki for Vavien
 Hayk Kırakosyan for 7 Husbands for Hurmuz
 Levent Semerci & Vedat Özdemir for Breath

Best Screenplay Award
 Winner: Engin Günaydın for Vavien
 İnan Temelkuran for Bornova Bornova
 Levent Semerci, M. İlkay Altınay & Hakan Evrensel for Breath
 Yeşim Ustaoğlu for Pandora's Box
 Yılmaz Erdoğan for Jolly Life

Best Music Award
 Winner: Attila Özdemiroğlu for Vavien
 Ender Akay & Sunay Özgür for 7 Husbands for Hurmuz
 Erkan Oğur for Bogeyman
 Mazlum Çimen for Dot
 Yıldıray Gürgen, Tevfik Akbaşlı & Mahsun Kırmızıgül for I Saw the Sun

Best Young Talent Award
 Winner: Elit İşcan for My Only Sunshine
 BKM Mutfak Oyuncuları for Jolly Life
 Damla Sönmez for Bornova Bornova
 Onur Ünsal for Pandora's Box
 Umut Kurt for Pains of Autumn

Turkcell First Film Award
 Winner: Breath directed by Levent Semerci
 Love in Another Language directed by İlksen Başarır
 On the Way to School directed by Orhan Eskiköy
 Bogeyman directed by Atalay Taşdiken
 Wrong Rosary directed by Mahmut Fazıl Coşkun

See also
 Yeşilçam Award
 Turkish films of 2009
 2009 in film

External links
  for the awards (Turkish)

References

2010 in Turkey
2009 film awards
Yeşilçam Award
2010 in Istanbul